"Midnight Confessions" is a song written by Lou T. Josie and originally performed by the Ever-Green Blues. American rock band The Grass Roots later made it famous when they released it as a single in 1968. Though never released on any of the group's studio albums, it was on their first compilation album, Golden Grass, and has since been included on many of their other compilations.

The Grass Roots version became the band's biggest charting hit on the Billboard Hot 100, reaching the Top 5 of both the U.S. and Canadian pop singles charts.

Background and recording 
The lyrics describe a man who is infatuated with a married woman, knows he can never have her, and is relegated to confessing his love for her audibly, but alone. The original recording of "Midnight Confessions" was a demo by the Evergreen Blues Band, whose manager – Lou Josie – wrote the song. The demo contained a horn section and caught the attention of Record producer/engineer Steve Barri, who was looking to produce a song for the Grass Roots that was a "West Coast" version of a Motown-style production. The Grass Roots track was produced/engineered by Steve Barri with the horn section's arrangement by Jimmie Haskell. The instrumentation was recorded by the group of LA studio-musicians known as The Wrecking Crew, as were many hits by the Grass Roots. Rob Grill and Warren Entner shared lead vocals, with Grill singing the verses and Entner, the choruses.

Personnel 
Per the Wrecking Crew's Facebook page.

The Grass Roots

 Rob Grill – lead and backing vocals
 Warren Entner – lead and backing vocals
 Creed Bratton – backing vocals
 Rick Coonce – backing vocals
Additional musicians

 Ben Benay – electric guitar         
 Mike Deasy – electric guitar
 Carol Kaye – bass
 Don Randi – piano
 Larry Knechtel – organ
 Hal Blaine – drums
 Emil Richards – percussion
 Plas Johnson – saxophone
John Audino – trumpet
Bud Childers – trumpet
Tony Terran – trumpet
Richard Hyde – trombone
Harold Diner – trombone
Edward Kusby – trombone

Release and reception 
"Midnight Confessions" was released as a single by the ABC/Dunhill record label in late June 1968. It was the Grass Roots' first to feature a horn section and was therefore a departure from the group's previous singles; the band members worried that this would preclude it from becoming a hit. However, it was well received and became their biggest hit in the United States, peaking at #5 on the Billboard Hot 100 on November 2, 1968, and was certified gold by the Recording Industry Association of America, with sales of over one million units, on December 3, 1968. The single also did well in Canada, peaking at #4 on the RPM 100 singles chart.

Chart performance

Weekly charts

Year-end charts

Notable cover versions
Patti Drew (c. 1968)
Phyllis Dillon (c. 1968-71)
Carolyne Mas (1980)
Karla DeVito (US Billboard #109, 1981)
Fastbacks (1984)
Rock City Angels (1989)
Carol Lynn Townes (1993)
Ron Dante of The Archies (1999)
Paul Revere & the Raiders (2000)
Lou Josie, solo album Me and Mother Music (2002)

References

External links
 

1968 singles
The Grass Roots songs
1968 songs
ABC Records singles
Dunhill Records singles